"Anything" is a song by American rock band Third Eye Blind from their second studio album, Blue (1999). It was released to radio as the lead single from the album on November 2, 1999, by Elektra Records.

Background
Frontman Stephan Jenkins is credited as the sole writer of the song, whilst production was collectively helmed by Jenkins, the Mud Sisters, Arion Salazar, and Third Eye Blind. The song peaked at number 11 on the Billboard Modern Rock chart and number 35 on the Mainstream Rock chart. Upon release, reviews were mostly positive.

Jason Carmer stated during a discussion that Jenkins was adamant about "Anything" being the lead single despite its length, and that the radio edit (which was included on the single release) was created at Elektra's request. It is the only single released from the first three studio albums that did not appear on the band's greatest hits compilation album A Collection.

Critical reception
Elysa Gardner of Entertainment Weekly commented that the song "hints at the band's growing sophistication." AllMusic's Stephen Thomas Erlewine and The A.V. Club writer Stephen Thompson both praised the song, with the latter describing it as "two minutes of pop joy".

Live performances
Third Eye Blind first performed the song on August 19, 1999, during a performance at the Maritime Hall in San Francisco, California.

Track listings and formats
 CD single
 "Anything" (extended version) – 2:46
 "Anything" (LP version) – 1:59
 "Anything" (acoustic version) – 1:49

Charts

Release history

References

1999 songs
1999 singles
Songs written by Stephan Jenkins
Third Eye Blind songs